Croat People's Union (Croatian abbreviation: HNZ) was a Bosnian Croat political party in Bosnia and Herzegovina. Party was founded by Ivo Pilar in 1910 with goal to represent interests of Croats in the Condominium of Bosnia and Herzegovina. With creation of Kingdom of Yugoslavia, HNZ become inactive and was refounded in 1992 by Milenko Brkić and in 2010 it was incorporated into the Croatian Party of Rights of Bosnia and Herzegovina.

History

Austria-Hungary
Austrian-Hungarian authorities found foundation of the Ante Starčević's Party of Rights (Stranka prava) in the Condominium of Bosnia and Herzegovina undesirable. The group of Croat intellectuals thus founded Croat People's Union with goal to establish Starčević's party ideology. HNZ was mostly supported by peasantry, tradesmen and franciscans. Party's leader was Nikola Mandić, while other prominent members of the party were Ivo Pilar, Safvet-beg Bašagić, Hamid Ekrem Sahinović and Jozo Sunarić.
Other party which used elements of Starčević's policy was Croat Catholic Association (Hrvatska katolička udruga, HKU), which was not secular party as HNZ was. Its leader was Roman Catholic bishop, Josip Stadler. HKU made good relations with Pure Party of Rights in Kingdom of Croatia-Slavonia and especially in Kingdom of Dalmatia and also Catholic-Social Party in Kingdom of Croatia-Slavonia. Party advocated political Catholicism and unification of Bosnia and Herzegovina with Croat lands.

Pilar and his associates stopped to cooperate with Catholic Association because of their political ideology, even though before that, they were in good relations to Stadler. Second reason for freezing of relations was effort of HKU to unite Bosnia and Herzegovina with Croat lands, which Bosnian Muslims and Serbs didn't approve. Since both, HNZ and HKU were part of Pan-Pravaštvo organization, both parties continued to cooperate in 1911 until the end of the World War I.
On the election for Bosnian legislature in 1910, HNZ won 12 out of 16 seats reserved for Catholic representatives. After the end of World War I, and with creation of Kingdom of Yugoslavia, HNZ ceased to exist.

Reestablishment and incorporation
HNZ was refounded in 1992 and its first president was Milenko Brkić. At first, HNZ opposed to policy of the Croatian Democratic Union of Bosnia and Herzegovina (HDZ BiH). However, at the election in 2002 and election in 2006, HNZ was in a coalition with the HDZ BiH. HNZ also called Bosnian Croats not to vote at the elections in the Republic of Croatia.

In February 2010, president of the HSP BiH, Zvonko Jurišić, president of the Croat Union of Herzeg-Bosnia, Petar Milić and Brkić met and agreed to act under a single name, Croatian Party of Rights of Bosnia and Herzegovina. At the 2010 election, HSP BiH entered into a Croatian Coalition along with Croatian Democratic Union 1990. By this act, HNZ once again opposed HDZ BiH.

References

Croat political parties in Bosnia and Herzegovina
Croatian nationalist parties
Defunct political parties in Bosnia and Herzegovina
History of the Croats of Bosnia and Herzegovina